Riverdance is a theatrical show that consists mainly of traditional Irish music and dance. With a score composed by Bill Whelan, it originated as an interval act during the Eurovision Song Contest 1994, featuring Irish dancing champions Jean Butler, Michael Flatley and the vocal ensemble Anúna. Shortly afterwards, husband and wife production team John McColgan and Moya Doherty expanded it into a stage show, which opened in Dublin on 9 February 1995. Since then, the show has visited over 450 venues worldwide and been seen by over 25 million people, making it one of the most successful dance productions in the world.

Background
Riverdance is rooted in a three-part suite of baroque-influenced traditional music called Timedance. Timedance was composed, recorded and performed for the 1981 Eurovision Song Contest, which was hosted by Ireland. At the time, Bill Whelan and Dónal Lunny composed the music, augmenting the Irish folk band Planxty with a rock rhythm section of electric bass and drums and a four-piece horn section. The piece was performed, with accompanying ballet dancers, during the interval of the contest, and later released as a Planxty single. Whelan had also produced EastWind, a 1992 album by Planxty member Andy Irvine with Davy Spillane, which fused Irish and Balkan folk music and influenced the genesis of "Riverdance". Thirteen years later, Whelan was invited to do the intermission piece for another Eurovision Song Contest in Dublin, and composed "Riverdance". In a book about Planxty (The Humours of Planxty, by Leagues O'Toole), Whelan says, "It was no mistake of mine to call it Riverdance because it connected absolutely to Timedance".

History

Eurovision performance and aftermath of interval act (1994)
Riverdance was first performed during the seven-minute interval of the Eurovision Song Contest 1994 at the Point Theatre in Dublin on 30 April 1994. The performance was transmitted to an estimated 300 million viewers worldwide and earned a standing ovation from the packed theatre of 4,000 people. The performance is often considered the most well-known interval act in Eurovision history. Riverdance was later performed as an interval act at both the Congratulations: 50 Years of the Eurovision Song Contest (2005) and Eurovision Song Contest's Greatest Hits (2015) anniversary events.

As one report put it, lead dancers Michael Flatley and Jean Butler "transformed the previously chaste and reserved traditional dance form into something else entirely", and after witnessing the initial enthusiasm for the performance in Ireland, husband and wife production team Moya Doherty and John McColgan decided to invest over $1 million into producing a full-length show.

The song "Riverdance" was released as a single featuring Anúna and the RTÉ Concert Orchestra and entered the Irish Singles Chart at No. 1 right after the Eurovision debut, staying there for 18 weeks—the longest amount of time a song has ever topped the Irish chart. It is currently the second highest-selling single of all time in Ireland, behind only Elton John's 1997 double A-side "Candle in the Wind 1997"/"Something About the Way You Look Tonight".

On 11 August 1994, in response to the Rwandan genocide of May/June 1994, the RTÉ video 'Riverdance for Rwanda' was launched to help raise money for Irish relief agencies in Rwanda. The video raised $500,000 for the cause and sold 100,000 copies in a week.

In November 1994, Riverdance, the original seven-minute version, was invited to perform in London at the prestigious Royal Variety Performance in the presence of Prince Charles. The act, which took place on 28 November at Dominion Theatre, was introduced on stage by Sir Terry Wogan. Earlier that month, tickets went on sale for "Riverdance: The Show", exceeding IR£1million in three weeks.

Dublin and London (February–July 1995)
"Riverdance: The Show" opened at the Point Theatre in Dublin on 9 February 1995. The five-week run was sold out within three days of the tickets going on sale, with tickets reaching record sales of over 120,000. Behind Doherty and McColgan, and composer Bill Whelan, the show starred Flatley and Butler, and featured many of the original Eurovision dance troupe. In April 1995, the video of the show was released in Ireland and went straight to No. 1 in the Irish charts.

On 8 May 1995, Riverdance performed at the Royal Gala 50th Anniversary of VE Day celebrations at the special invitation of Prince Charles. The show attracted a television audience of 20 million, introducing Riverdance to a whole new set of fans.

On 5 June 1995, the video of "Riverdance: The Show" was released in the UK and went straight to the No. 2 position in the UK charts, moving to No. 1 the following week, and holding the No. 1 or No. 2 positions for the next seven months, becoming the all-time best-selling music video in the UK. A day later, Riverdance opened at The Apollo in London for a sell-out four-week run.

On 17 July 1995, Riverdance performed at London's Royal College of Music in the presence of Queen Elizabeth The Queen Mother, Queen Elizabeth II, and Princess Margaret. Later that month, Riverdance returned, by popular demand, to the Point Theatre for a six-week sell-out run.

Flatley's departure and second London run (October 1995)
Despite the show's growing success, cracks were beginning to appear in the relationship between the producers and lead dancer Michael Flatley. Flatley had choreographed many of the numbers in the multicultural spectacle, but after the show took off, the two parties clashed over salary and royalty fees. At the end of September 1995, a contract dispute arose between Flatley and Riverdance. On 29 September, days before the show was due to reopen for a second sell-out run at The Apollo, Flatley's TV appearances suddenly became focused on rumours that he was about to walk out. Flatley claimed the dispute had nothing to do with money, but rather creative control of his own choreography. No contract was ever signed—despite media reports indicating he had—because Flatley and his management would not agree to terms. Negotiations reached a stalemate by 2 October, and with 21 hours to go before the show's opening, Doherty opted to sack her star, replacing him with Colin Dunne, nine-times World Irish Dancing Champion. Dunne, who had only just joined the cast and creative team of Riverdance, was initially invited to choreograph and perform the newly commissioned number "Trading Taps" with Tarik Winston. To make matters worse for the producers, Jean Butler turned up days before opening night with her leg in a cast and on crutches, and was unable to perform. As a result, Dunne paired up with original Eurovision troupe member Eileen Martin for the opening night, as they looked to salvage the show and make a name for themselves.

On 3 October, Riverdance opened for another six-week sell-out run at The Apollo. By overwhelming public demand, the run was extended twice, making a box office record of 151 sold-out shows at the venue. During this extended period, Riverdance returned to the Royal Variety Performance at Dominion Theatre, where they performed Dunne's choreographed piece "Trading Taps" in the presence of Queen Elizabeth and Prince Philip on 20 November 1995.

New York City (March 1996)
Following phenomenal success in Dublin and London in 1995, Riverdance travelled to the United States for the first time in March 1996. On 13 March, the show opened at the legendary Radio City Music Hall for the first of eight sold-out performances over five days. Costing about $2 million to bring the show from Ireland, Riverdance broke even in its first New York outing.

Continued success in Ireland and London (March–May 1996)
After returning to Ireland and incurring successful runs in Belfast and Cork, Riverdance made their way back to The Apollo in May 1996 for a three and a half month run; the show saw advance box office sales in excess of £5m. The show was later extended until the middle of January 1997.

US tour (October 1996 – February 1997)
On 2 October 1996, Riverdance kicked off its US tour at Radio City Music Hall, christening their new US company the Lee (after Cork's main river), while the company continuing to perform in the UK was dubbed the Liffey (after Dublin's main river). After 23 performances at Radio City between 2 October and 20 October, the Lee company moved on to Chicago, Los Angeles and Boston, as well as Detroit and Minneapolis.

Cast departures
A number of cast departures occurred following the halcyon period of early 1996. In September 1996, Anúna left the show, which was followed swiftly by Jean Butler's departure in January 1997. Then in June 1998, Colin Dunne left Riverdance to begin work on a new project with Butler – Dancing on Dangerous Ground.

Early 2000s
In March 2000, the show moved to Broadway's Gershwin Theatre and featured lead dancers Pat Roddy and Eileen Martin of the Shannon company, and singers Brian Kennedy and Tsidii Le Loka. Colin Dunne briefly returned to Riverdance in July 2002 to perform his original choreographed piece "Trading Taps" at New York City's One World Jam at Radio City Music Hall. In June 2003, Breandán de Gallaí and Joanne Doyle featured as the lead dancers at the Opening Ceremony of the 2003 Special Olympics in Dublin. The Opening Ceremony performance also featured the longest troupe line ever seen in an Irish dance show, with over 100 dancers.

Legacy

Riverdance continues to be performed all over the world, in a diminished format and in smaller venues. Current productions are geared towards smaller theatres, whereas past productions have been performed in large theatres and arenas. Sets have therefore been simplified and some numbers contain fewer performers than in past productions (such as those seen on the Live from New York City (1996) and Live from Geneva (2002) DVDs). Each production company is named after an Irish river: Liffey, Lee, Lagan, Avoca, Shannon, Boyne, Corrib, Foyle, Moy and Bann.

On 21 July 2013, a record was set when a line of 1,693 dancers from 44 countries danced to Riverdance on a bridge overlooking the River Liffey, led by Jean Butler and Padraic Moyles.

Animated film
In February 2020, an animated feature film inspired by Riverdance was announced, titled Riverdance: The Animated Adventure. The film is being produced by River Productions and Aniventure, and is being created by visual effects and animation studio Cinesite, in Montreal. In September 2020, it was announced that Pierce Brosnan, Lilly Singh, Jermaine Fowler, Pauline McLynn, Aisling Bea, John Kavanagh and Brendan Gleeson would feature as voice actors in the film. It was announced that the film will be premiering on 28 May 2021 exclusively on Sky Cinema.

Dance numbers and songs performed

Notable lead dancers

Michael Flatley
Jean Butler
Colin Dunne
Breandán de Gallaí
Joanne Doyle
Kevin McCormack

Other notable dancers
María Pagés (flamenco dancer)

Musicians
In the spirit of traditional sessions, the musicians play on stage without sheet music.

Anúna - vocal ensemble
Cormac Breatnach - tin whistle
Máire Breatnach - fiddle
Ronan Browne - uilleann pipes
Robbie Casserly - bass, drums
Áine Uí Cheallaigh - vocals
Anthony Drennan - guitar
Noel Eccles - percussion
Kenneth Edge - soprano sax
Juan Reina Gonzalez - cantor
Tom Hayes - bodhrán, spoons
Eileen Ivers - fiddle
Declan Masterson - uilleann pipes, low whistle
Des Moore - acoustic guitar
Máirtín O'Connor - accordion
Prionsias O'Duinn - conductor
Michael McGlynn - choral director
David Hayes - conductor, piano
Eoghan O'Neill - bass guitar
Nikola Parov - gadulka, kaval
Desi Reynolds - drums, tom-tom
Rafael Riqueni - guitar
Davy Spillane - uilleann pipes, tin whistle

Recordings

CD
Riverdance: Music from the Show (1995)
Riverdance 25th Anniversary: Music from the Show (2019)

VHS
Riverdance: The Show (1995)

DVD
Riverdance: A Journey (1996)
Riverdance: Live From New York City (1996)
Riverdance: Live From Geneva (2002)
Riverdance: The Documentary 10 Years (2005)
The Best Of Riverdance (2005)
Riverdance: Live From Beijing (2010)
Riverdance: The Collection [5 DVD Set] (2010)
Riverdance 25 Anniversary Show: Live In Dublin (2020)

See also
The Countess Cathleen
Cú Chulainn
Music of Ireland

References

External links
Official website
Finale of original 'Riverdance The Show', 9 February 1995 at journalofmusic.com
Other productions: Riverdance. List of Riverdance DVDs at tyroneproductions.ie
Riverdance 20 Years, 2014 Press Information PDF at forumcopenhagen.dk
The Insiders, the Riverdance story on YouTube

1981 compositions
1994 in Irish television
1995 in theatre
Eurovision Song Contest 1981
Irish Singles Chart number-one singles
Irish dance
Irish stepdance
Eurovision Song Contest 1994
Flamenco
Tap dance